DreamWorks Television was an American television distribution and production company based in Universal City, California, that was a division of DreamWorks. It folded into Amblin Television in 2013.

History 
DreamWorks Television was formed in December 1994 as DreamWorks Pictures agreed to a $200 million seven-year television production joint venture with the Capital Cities/ABC. The company was set up to produce series for broadcast networks, cable channels and first run syndication with no first look for the ABC Network, but financial incentives favored ABC. The first show, Champs, was scheduled as a mid-season replacement for the ABC network. Dan McDermott was named division chief executive in June 1995. DreamWorks Television's first success was Spin City on ABC. The Walt Disney Company bought Capital Cities/ABC in February 1996.

In 1997, DreamWorks Television had a falling-out with NBC over the development of various TV shows. The dispute was eventually settled, and went to being a development slater for NBC in 1998. In 1998, DreamWorks has struck a deal with Paramount Domestic Television to syndicate Spin City for off-net syndication.

In 2002, the company's joint venture agreement with ABC ended. This agreement was replaced by a development agreement with NBC with a first look clause, financing for series pickups by the network while taking a financial stake in the show. DreamWorks Television could finance shows sold to other outlets, and NBC paid an annual fee to it.

TV shows 
The entire pre-2008 DreamWorks Television catalogue is currently owned and distributed worldwide by CBS Media Ventures with the exception of the programs Line of Fire, Carpoolers and Oliver Beene (distributed by Disney–ABC Home Entertainment and Television Distribution), Las Vegas (distributed in North America by NBCUniversal Television Distribution and internationally by MGM Worldwide Television Distribution), Father of the Pride (distributed by NBCUniversal Television Distribution), Off Centre (distributed by Warner Bros. Television), Band of Brothers (distributed by HBO Enterprises), Miracle Workers (distributed by Entertainment One), and Rescue Me (distributed by Sony Pictures Television); Paramount also co-distributes the following DWTV programs including The Job (with Disney–ABC Home Entertainment and Television Distribution), Boomtown (with NBCUniversal Television Distribution in North America and MGM Worldwide Television Distribution outside North America) and Alienators: Evolution Continues (North American joint distribution with WildBrain; international joint distribution to the series has been held by Sony Pictures Television and WildBrain). In 2011, Netflix made a streaming deal with DreamWorks gaining the rights for streaming its movies, TV shows and TV shows specials.

TV series produced by DreamWorks Television

1990s

2000s

2010s

TV specials produced by DreamWorks Television 
TV specials produced by DreamWorks Television:
 The Secret World of "Antz" (1998)
 When You Believe: Music From "The Prince of Egypt" (1998)
 Galaxy Quest: 20th Anniversary: The Journey Continues (1999)
 The Hatching of "Chicken Run" (2000)
 Gladiator Games: The Roman Bloodsport (2000)
 We Stand Alone Together (2001)
 What Lies Beneath: Constructing the Perfect Thriller (2001)
 Woody Allen: A Life in Film (2002)

TV series produced by DreamWorks Animation 
These are TV series produced by DreamWorks Animation (DWA) that were distributed by DWTV around the world. In 2004, the animation division of DreamWorks was spun off as a separate company (and now bought by NBCUniversal in 2016) and thus animated shows after 2004 do not apply here.

 Invasion America (1998)
 Toonsylvania (1998–2000)
 Alienators: Evolution Continues (2001–2002)
 Father of the Pride (2004–2005)

References

External links 
 DreamWorks Studios website 

Television
Defunct film and television production companies of the United States
Television production companies of the United States
Entertainment companies based in California
Companies based in Los Angeles County, California
Universal City, California
American companies established in 1996
Mass media companies established in 1996
Mass media companies disestablished in 2013
1996 establishments in California
2013 disestablishments in California
Defunct companies based in Greater Los Angeles
Steven Spielberg
Jeffrey Katzenberg
David Geffen